Robert Burr Livingston (October 9, 1918 – April 26, 2002) was an American physician, neuroscientist, and social activist.

Early life
Livingston was born on October 9, 1918 in Boston. He completed his undergraduate studies (in 1940), medical degree (in 1944), and residency at Stanford University.

Career
As a Naval Reserve officer, Livingston served in Okinawa and earned a Bronze Star during World War II.  His experience as a physician in a United States Navy hospital during the Atomic bombings of Hiroshima and Nagasaki lead him to a lifelong opposition to nuclear arms.  He was co-founder and President of the San Diego chapter of Physicians for Social Responsibility.  After the war he joined the Yale University college of medicine as a professor of physiology.  He served on the faculty of the University of California, Los Angeles from 1952 to 1960. In other teaching appointments at Stanford and Harvard he also taught pathology, anatomy, and psychiatry.  In the 1950s he served as physician to a Scripps Institution of Oceanography expedition.  He was appointed Scientific Director of the National Institute of Mental Health and the National Institute of Neurological Diseases and Blindness during the Eisenhower and Kennedy administrations.  He advised James Humes, the navy pathologist who performed the autopsy on John F. Kennedy, and based on his personal experience and observations became a skeptic of the "Lone gunman theory".

After his time at the National Institutes of Health, in 1964 Livingston founded the neuroscience department, the first of its kind in the world, at the newly built University of California, San Diego campus.  He served as chairman of the department until 1970, as professor until 1989, and as professor emeritus until his death in 2002.  His best known research was in the computer mapping and imaging of the human brain.  His interest in the brain also extended to questions of cognition, consciousness, emotions, and spirituality.  He was active in the International Physicians for the Prevention of Nuclear War, which won the Nobel Peace Prize in 1985.  In 1988 Livingston met and befriended the Dalai Lama, for whom he served as a science advisor. He died in 2002 at the Thornton Hospital in San Diego, California.

Livingston was an avid mountain climbing and hiking friend of Robert S. McNamara.

Publications

Sensory Processing, Perception and Behavior

References

External links
Robert Livingston Papers - at the UCSD Mandeville Library
 - documentary about production of Livingston's 3-dimensional human brain imaging film 

1918 births
2002 deaths
Stanford University alumni
Stanford University School of Medicine faculty
David Geffen School of Medicine at UCLA faculty
Harvard University faculty
American neuroscientists
American anti–nuclear weapons activists
Yale School of Medicine faculty
Activists from California